Ancerville is the name of the following communes in France:

 Ancerville, Meuse, in the Meuse department
 Ancerville, Moselle, in the Moselle department